Hope & Redemption: The Lena Baker Story is a 2008 historical film. It is an adaptation of the book by Lela Bond Phillips, which chronicles the life and death of Lena Baker, an African-American woman in Georgia who was convicted in 1945 of capital murder and was the only woman to be executed by electric chair. She was posthumously pardoned by the state in 2005. The film was written for the screen and directed by Ralph Wilcox and stars Tichina Arnold and Peter Coyote.

As the opening night premiere film for the 2008 Atlanta Film Festival, it sold out. The film was also screened at the Cannes Film Festival on May 16, 2008.

Plot
The film chronicles the life of Lena Baker, born to a sharecropper family, who later worked as a maid in a small county town to support her three children. Convicted in 1945 of capital murder by an all-white, male jury, Baker was the only woman in Georgia to be executed by the electric chair. Baker acted in self-defense in the fatal shooting of her employer, Ernest Knight, during a struggle. He was an abusive drunk who had forced the 44-year-old woman into a sexual relationship and sometimes held her at his place against her will. She was posthumously pardoned in 2005.

Cast
 Tichina Arnold as Lena Baker
 Kaya Camp as Young Lena Baker
 Peter Coyote as Ernest Knight
 Michael Rooker as Randolph County Sheriff
 Beverly Todd as Lena's Mother
 Randy McDowell as Lyle Jacobs
 Tom Huff as Ken Thomas
 L. Warren Young as Milton
 Ron Clinton Smith
 Dwayne Boyd
 Santana Shelton as Nettie
 Kenny Cook as Barry Arthur
 Kajuan Wilson as Earl Baker

References

External links
 
 
 
 Ralph Wilcox, "Films Have Power to Be the Voice of Change", Moving Pictures Magazine

2008 films
2008 biographical drama films
American biographical drama films
Drama films based on actual events
Films about capital punishment
Films set in 1944
Films set in 1945
Films set in Georgia (U.S. state)
Films based on non-fiction books
2008 drama films
2000s English-language films
2000s American films